Ayatollah Seyyed Mohammad Ziaabadi (1928 - 8 February 2021) (Persian: سید محمد ضیاءآبادی) was an Iranian Mujtahid that was based in the Tehran Islamic Seminary. He specialised in Islamic ethics and interpretation of the Quran.

Early Childhood and Education 
Ziaabadi was born in Ziaabad to a religious family. His father Seyyed Mahmoud Ziaabadi was a well-trusted and known clergy man who would often lead prayers. Ziaabadi began his Islamic studies in Qazvin Seminary, however, in 1949 he left to continue his Islamic studies in Qom Seminary, where he was taught by the likes of Hossein Borujerdi, Muhammad Husayn Tabatabai, and Ruhollah Khomeini for around 12 years.

Migration to Tehran 
After spending 12 years studying in Qom Seminary, it was in 1961 after the death of Hossein Borujerdi in which he migrated to Tehran. At the time, there was a lack of Islamic Scholars in big cities. This prompted Ayatollah Hossein Borujerdi to influence scholars migrating to big cities in Iran and establishing Islamic Seminaries there. Thus, similar to Ayatollah Haghsenas, he migrated to Tehran under the influence of Borujerdi. He spent the rest of his life teaching and studying alongside Ahmad Mojtahedi Tehrani, in the Ayatollah Mojtahed Theological School.

Death 
It was first speculated that Ziaabadi died of Coronavirus during the COVID-19 pandemic in Iran, however, it was actually due to coronary heart disease and his old age that led to his death. His death prompted many popular figures in Iran to send their condolences such as Hassan Rouhani and Ali Khamenei due to his popularity.  Many attended his funeral, and he is buried in Shah Abdol-Azim Shrine.

See Also
 List of Ayatollahs

References

People from Qazvin
1928 births
2021 deaths
Iranian ayatollahs
Iranian Muslim mystics